Ross-Hand Mansion is a historic home located at South Nyack in Rockland County, New York.  The land was acquired from the Tallman family in 1856 by Azariah Ross (1787-1878).  Ross was a veteran of the War of 1812 and a successful New York City property developer. He was a longtime resident of Rockland County, having moved there in about 1820. The design of the Mansion is closely based on a design for 'A Country House in the Pointed Style' from the Architecture of Country Houses: including designs for cottages, farm-houses, and villas, with remarks on interiors, furniture, and the best modes of warming and ventilating by the great landscape designer and architect Andrew Jackson Downing.  The three story brick mansion with Gothic Revival style features was completed in 1859.  It features ornamental bargeboards and a steeply pitched gable roof.

In the 1870s to try to stave off financial uncertainty, Ross converted his house into a hotel, the Ross Mansion. (In the application packet to have the house considered for inclusion on the National Register of Historic Places, one source incorrectly attributes another name to the house during its years as a hotel.) 1883, after Ross' death, the home was purchased at public auction by Mary Elizabeth Haddock Hand.  Mary's husband, William Henry Hand, specialized in decorative woodwork and, with their sons William, Roger and Walter, he completed extensive renovations on the property and installed elements, including a marble fireplace, from the Alexander Turney Stewart Mansion on Fifth Avenue in Manhattan that had lately been demolished.  They converted the rear part of the property into a working farm. Hand's grandson, also named William Henry Hand, was an assistant to an elderly Thomas Edison. However, strong ethical differences over Edison's business practices led Hand to set out on his own and by 1930 he had established the Hand Laboratory for Electro-Chemical Research and Development in a barn on the grounds of his family's South Nyack mansion. It was there where, over the next thirty years, Hand and his small team developed a long-life battery that was used by emergency services, the military, public works vehicles, school buses and in boats.

William Henry Hand lived at the house with his brother Raymond, sister Dorothy and her daughter Adelma. When William died in 1978, Dorothy and Adelma and Adelma's children were the remaining occupants. In the early 1990s when Adelma wanted to list the property for sale, the analysis of soil samples found dangerous levels of lead contamination: over three decades of battery development, it appears that battery acid, lead and other experimental material was dumped on the grounds of the mansion. The property was deemed a risk to human health and placed as a Class 2 site on the New York State Department of Environmental Conservation Division of Hazardous Waste Remediation register of Inactive Hazardous Waste Sites, #344040. Adelma undertook a private remediation on her property. The NYS DEC performed additional soil testing of neighbouring properties and implemented their full remediation with state funds. The area was finally considered safe and removed from the NYS DEC register in 1998.

The property was sold in 1998, then again in 2014 and, most recently, in 2019.

Also on the property is a 19th-century barn and stable with a gymnasium (in the former battery laboratory) and a small brick smokehouse.

The Ross-Hand Mansion was listed on the National Register of Historic Places in 1983.

References

Houses on the National Register of Historic Places in New York (state)
Gothic Revival architecture in New York (state)
Houses completed in 1860
Houses in Rockland County, New York
National Register of Historic Places in Rockland County, New York